Ivan Hall  is a British architectural historian specialising in the architecture of John Carr. He was born in Manchester and attended Manchester Grammar School and Manchester University.

He initially read architecture as a contemporary of Donald Buttress and intended to be a restoration architect, but later changed subject to art history. He worked as an academic at Hull University but spent later years working for English Heritage in London. He campaigned  with his wife Elisabeth Hall to preserve historic buildings and their environments.

His published works include: 
Historic Beverley,
Georgian Hull
John Carr of York, Architect, A Pictorial Survey.

References

1932 births
Living people
Alumni of the Victoria University of Manchester
English architectural historians